Gosain is an Indian surname. Notable people with the surname include:

Satpal Gosain (1935–2020), Indian politician
Shivani Gosain (born 1975), Indian actress
Suhit Gosain (born 1985), Indian pop singer, actor, and performer

See also
 Gosains
 Gossain

Surnames of Indian origin